The Sarawak River is a river in Sarawak, Malaysia. It is an important source of water and transportation for the inhabitants in southwestern Sarawak. The river is also used for water-related sport activities such as the annual Sarawak Regatta which attract tourists from all over the world.

The Astana, the official residence of the Yang di-Pertua Negeri Sarawak (Governor of Sarawak) and the New Sarawak State Legislative Assembly Building is located on the north bank of the river as well as Fort Margherita.

It runs around Holiday Inn Kuching (now named Grand Margherita Hotel) and Riverbank Suites apartment near the river. The Sarawak River Cruise runs around it.

See also 
Sungai Sarawak Regulation Scheme

References 
 MacKinnon K, Hatta G, Halim H, Mangalik A.1998. The ecology of Kalimantan. Oxford University Press, Australia.

Rivers of Sarawak
Rivers of Malaysia